Ras-related protein Rab-31 is a protein that in humans is encoded by the RAB31 gene.

References

Further reading